Aircraft noise pollution refers to noise produced by aircraft in flight that has been associated with several negative stress-mediated health effects, from sleep disorders to cardiovascular ones. Governments have enacted extensive controls that apply to aircraft designers, manufacturers, and operators, resulting in improved procedures and cuts in pollution.

Sound production is divided into three categories:

 Mechanical noise—rotation of the engine parts, most noticeable when fan blades reach supersonic speeds.
 Aerodynamic noise—from the airflow around the surfaces of the aircraft, especially when flying low at high speeds.
 Noise from aircraft systems—cockpit and cabin pressurization and conditioning systems, and Auxiliary Power units.

Mechanisms of sound production

Aircraft noise is noise pollution produced by an aircraft or its components, whether on the ground while parked such as auxiliary power units, while taxiing, on run-up from propeller and jet exhaust, during takeoff, underneath and lateral to departure and arrival paths, over-flying while en route, or during landing. A moving aircraft including the jet engine or propeller causes compression and rarefaction of the air, producing motion of air molecules. This movement propagates through the air as pressure waves. If these pressure waves are strong enough and within the audible frequency spectrum, a sensation of hearing is produced. Different aircraft types have different noise levels and frequencies. The noise originates from three main sources:

 Engine and other mechanical noise
 Aerodynamic noise
 Noise from aircraft systems

Engine and other mechanical noise

Much of the noise in propeller aircraft comes equally from the propellers and aerodynamics. Helicopter noise is aerodynamically induced noise from the main and tail rotors and mechanically induced noise from the main gearbox and various transmission chains. The mechanical sources produce narrow band high intensity peaks relating to the rotational speed and movement of the moving parts. In computer modelling terms noise from a moving aircraft can be treated as a line source.

Aircraft gas turbine engines (jet engines) are responsible for much of the aircraft noise during takeoff and climb, such as the buzzsaw noise generated when the tips of the fan blades reach supersonic speeds. However, with advances in noise reduction technologies—the airframe is typically more noisy during landing.

The majority of engine noise is due to jet noise—although high bypass-ratio turbofans do have considerable fan noise. The high velocity jet leaving the back of the engine has an inherent shear layer instability (if not thick enough) and rolls up into ring vortices. This later breaks down into turbulence. The SPL associated with engine noise is proportional to the jet speed (to a high power). Therefore, even modest reductions in exhaust velocity will produce a large reduction in jet noise.

Engines are the main source of aircraft noise. The geared Pratt & Whitney PW1000G helped reduce the noise levels of the Bombardier CSeries, Mitsubishi MRJ and Embraer E-Jet E2 crossover narrowbody aircraft: the gearbox allows the fan to spin at an optimal speed, which is one third the speed of the LP turbine, for slower fan tip speeds. It has a 75% smaller noise footprint than current equivalents. The PowerJet SaM146 in the Sukhoi Superjet 100 features 3D aerodynamic fan blades and a nacelle with a long mixed duct flow nozzle to reduce noise.

Aerodynamic noise

Aerodynamic noise arises from the airflow around the aircraft fuselage and control surfaces. This type of noise increases with aircraft speed and also at low altitudes due to the density of the air. Jet-powered aircraft create intense noise from aerodynamics. Low-flying, high-speed military aircraft produce especially loud aerodynamic noise.

The shape of the nose, windshield or canopy of an aircraft affects the sound produced. Much of the noise of a propeller aircraft is of aerodynamic origin due to the flow of air around the blades. The helicopter main and tail rotors also give rise to aerodynamic noise. This type of aerodynamic noise is mostly low frequency determined by the rotor speed.

Typically noise is generated when flow passes an object on the aircraft, for example, the wings or landing gear. There are broadly two main types of airframe noise:

 Bluff Body Noise – the alternating vortex shedding from either side of a bluff body, creates low-pressure regions (at the core of the shed vortices) which manifest themselves as pressure waves (or sound). The separated flow around the bluff body is quite unstable, and the flow "rolls up" into ring vortices—which later break down into turbulence.
 Edge Noise – when turbulent flow passes the end of an object or gaps in a structure (high lift device clearance gaps) the associated fluctuations in pressure are heard as the sound propagates from the edge of the object (radially downwards).

Noise from aircraft systems

Cockpit and cabin pressurization and conditioning systems are often a major contributor within cabins of both civilian and military aircraft. However, one of the most significant sources of cabin noise from commercial jet aircraft, other than the engines, is the Auxiliary Power Unit (APU), an on‑board generator used in aircraft to start the main engines, usually with compressed air, and to provide electrical power while the aircraft is on the ground. Other internal aircraft systems can also contribute, such as specialized electronic equipment in some military aircraft.

Health effects

Aircraft engines are the major source of noise and can exceed 140 decibels (dB) during takeoff. While airborne, the main sources of noise are the engines and the high speed turbulence over the fuselage.

There are health consequences of elevated sound levels.  Elevated workplace or other noise can cause hearing impairment, hypertension, ischemic heart disease, annoyance, sleep disturbance, and decreased school performance. Although some hearing loss occurs naturally with age, in many developed nations the impact of noise is sufficient to impair hearing over the course of a lifetime. Elevated noise levels can create stress, increase workplace accident rates, and stimulate aggression and other anti-social behaviors. Airport noise has been linked to high blood pressure.
Aircraft noise increases risks of heart attacks.

German environmental study
A large-scale statistical analysis of the health effects of aircraft noise was undertaken in the late 2000s by Bernhard Greiser for the Umweltbundesamt, Germany's central environmental office. The health data of over one million residents around the Cologne airport were analysed for health effects correlating with aircraft noise. The results were then corrected for other noise influences in the residential areas, and for socioeconomic factors, to reduce possible skewing of the data.<ref name="Tödlicher Lärm' 2009, Page 45">Tödlicher Lärm—Spiegel, Nr. 51, 14 Dezember 2009, Page 45 </ref>

The German study concluded that aircraft noise clearly and significantly impairs health. For example, a day-time average sound pressure level of 60 decibels increasing coronary heart disease by 61% in men and 80% in women. As another indicator, a night-time average sound pressure level of 55 decibels increased the risk of heart attacks by 66% in men and 139% in women. Statistically significant health effects did however start as early as from an average sound pressure level of 40 decibels.

FAA advice
The Federal Aviation Administration (FAA) regulates the maximum noise level that individual civil aircraft can emit through requiring aircraft to meet certain noise certification standards. These standards designate changes in maximum noise level requirements by "stage" designation. The U.S. noise standards are defined in the Code of Federal Regulations (CFR) Title 14 Part 36 – Noise Standards: Aircraft Type and Airworthiness Certification (14 CFR Part 36). The FAA says that a maximum day-night average sound level of 65 dB is incompatible with residential communities. Communities in affected areas may be eligible for mitigation such as soundproofing.

Cabin noise

Aircraft noise also affects people within the aircraft: crew and passengers. Cabin noise can be studied to address the occupational exposure and the health and safety of pilots and flight attendants. In 1998, 64 commercial airline pilots were surveyed regarding hearing loss and tinnitus. In 1999, the NIOSH conducted several noise surveys and health hazard evaluations, and found noise levels exceeding its recommended exposure limit of 85 A-weighted decibels as an 8-hr TWA. In 2006, the noise levels inside an Airbus A321 during cruise have been reported as approximately 78 dB(A) and during taxi when the aircraft engines are producing minimal thrust, noise levels in the cabin have been recorded at 65 dB(A). In 2008, a study of Swedish airlines cabin crews found average sound levels between 78 and 84 dB(A) with maximum A-weighted exposure of 114 dB but found no major hearing threshold shifts. In 2018, a study of sound levels measured on 200 flights representing six aircraft groups found media noise level of 83.5 db(A) with levels reaching 110 dB(A) on certain flights, but only 4.5% exceeded the NIOSH recommended 8-hr TWA of 85 dB(A).

Cognitive effects

Simulated aircraft noise at 65 dB(A) has been shown to negatively affect individuals’ memory and recall of auditory information. In one study comparing the effect of aircraft noise to the effect of alcohol on cognitive performance, it was found that simulated aircraft noise at 65 dB(A) had the same effect on individuals’ ability to recall auditory information as being intoxicated with a Blood Alcohol Concentration (BAC) level of at 0.10. A BAC of 0.10 is double the legal limit required to operate a motor vehicle in many developed countries such as Australia.

Mitigation programs

In the United States, since aviation noise became a public issue in the late 1960s, governments have enacted legislative controls. Aircraft designers, manufacturers, and operators have developed quieter aircraft and better operating procedures. Modern high-bypass turbofan engines, for example, are quieter than the turbojets and low-bypass turbofans of the 1960s. First, FAA Aircraft Certification achieved noise reductions classified as "Stage 3" aircraft; which has been upgraded to "Stage 4" noise certification resulting in quieter aircraft. This has resulted in lower noise exposures in spite of increased traffic growth and popularity.

In the 1980s the U.S. Congress authorized the FAA to devise programs to insulate homes near airports. While this does not address the external noise, the program has been effective for residential interiors. Some of the first airports at which the technology was applied were San Francisco International Airport and San Jose International Airport in California. A computer model is used which simulates the effects of aircraft noise upon building structures. Variations of aircraft type, flight patterns and local meteorology can be studied. Then the benefits of building retrofit strategies such as roof upgrading, window glazing improvement, fireplace baffling, caulking construction seams can be evaluated.

Regulation

Stages are defined in the US Code of Federal Regulations (CFR) Title 14 Part 36.

For civil jet aircraft, the US FAA Stage 1 is the loudest and Stage 4 is quieter.
Stage 3 was required for all large jet and turboprop aircraft at US civilian airports from the year 2000,
and at least Stage 2 for under  MTOW jets until December 31, 2015.
The previous was Stage 4 for large airplanes, equivalent to the ICAO Annex 16, Volume 1 Chapter 4 standards, while the more stringent Chapter 14 became effective July 14, 2014, and was adopted by the FAA as Stage 5 from January 14, 2016, effective for new type certificates from December 31, 2017, or December 31, 2020 depending on weight.

The US allows both the louder Stage 1 and quiet Stage 2 helicopters.
The quietest Stage 3 helicopter noise standard became effective on May 5, 2014, and are consistent with ICAO Chapter 8 and Chapter 11.

Night flying restrictions
At Heathrow, Gatwick and Stansted airports in London, UK and Frankfurt Airport in Germany, night flying restrictions apply to reduce noise exposure at night.

 Satellite-based navigation systems 
A series of trials were undertaken at London's Heathrow Airport, between December 2013 and November 2014, as part of the UK's "Future Airspace Strategy", and the Europe-wide "Single European Sky" modernisation project. The trials demonstrated that using satellite-based navigation systems it was possible to offer noise relief to more surrounding communities, although this led to a significant unexpected rise in noise complaints (61,650 ) due to the concentrated flight paths. The study found that steeper angles for take-off and landing led to fewer people experiencing aircraft noise and that noise relief could be shared by using more precise flight paths, allowing control of the noise footprint of departing aircraft. Noise relief could be enhanced by switching flight paths, for example by using one flight path in the morning and another in the afternoon.

 Technological advances 

 Engine design 
Modern High bypass turbofans are not only more fuel efficient, but also much quieter than older turbojet and low-bypass turbofan engines. On newer engines noise-reducing chevrons further reduce the engine's noise, while on older engines hush kits are used to help mitigate their excessive noise.

 Engine location 

The ability to reduce noise may be limited if engines remain below aircraft's wings. NASA expects a cumulative 20–30 dB below Stage 4 limits by 2026–2031, but keeping aircraft noise within airport boundaries requires at least a 40–50 dB reduction. Landing gear, wing slats and wing flaps also produce noise and may have to be shielded from the ground with new configurations. NASA found over-wing and mid-fuselage nacelles could reduce noise by 30–40 dB, even 40–50 dB for hybrid wing body which may be essential for open rotors.

By 2020, helicopter technologies now in development, plus new procedures could reduce noise levels by 10 dB and noise footprints by 50%, but more advances are needed to preserve or expand heliports. Package delivery UAS will need to characterize their noise, establish limits and reduce their impact.

See also

Aviation taxation and subsidies
Electric airplane
Farley v Skinner
Hush kit
Helicopter noise reduction
Jet noise
Noise barrier
Rotor-stator interaction
Silent Aircraft Initiative
Train noise
XF-84H Thunderscreech, the loudest aircraft ever built.

General:
Health effects from noise
Noise pollution
Noise regulation
Aviation and the environment

ReferencesU.S. Noise Control Act of 1972 United States Code Citation: 42 U.S.C. 4901 to 4918
S. Rosen and P. Olin, Hearing loss and coronary heart disease, Archives of Otolaryngology'', 82:236 (1965)

External links
 
 
 
 
 
 

 
 
 
 
 
 
 

Aircraft noise
Noise
Sound
Environment and health